Oi Oi Oi is the debut studio album by German electronic music artist Boys Noize, released in 2007. In 2015, Vice placed it at number 93 on the "99 Greatest Dance Albums of All Time" list.

Track listing

Charts

References

External links 
 

2007 debut albums
Boys Noize albums